Sijjin is a supernatural horror film series from Turkey debuted in 2014. The original title SİCCÎN is a Kurmanji Kurdish word, literally translating 'violent' or 'vehement', according to the country of origin. Director Alper Mestçi returned to his horror works with this franchise after successfully making a pair of global box office hits. All the films are produced by Muhtesem Tözüm and were released under the banner of his Muhtesem Film studio. Right from the start, each of the films gained global acceptance and were quickly recognized as new wave of Turkish horror genre.

The title of this franchise is derived from the Arabic word Sijjin (سِجِّين) meaning either a book that lists the names of the damned or a prison, located in the bottom of hell. However, the word's origin is unknown. It appears in the Qur'an in Surah 83:7–9. A similar word (sijill) appears in 21:104 often translated as 'scroll'.

Films 
There are a total of 6 films in this franchise till to date. The latest installment has been released on 9 August 2019.

The films are all filmed in various regions of Turkey.

The first film was about Öznur, a beautiful woman who fell in love with a man known as Kudret, who is her cousin. When she learned that Kudret is [lawfully] married to another woman, Nisa, the jealous Öznur seeks help from a sorcerer to unleash black magic against Nisa, only to cause Kudret's family go through inexplicable troubles. However, the sorcery also effects and torments Öznur.

Siccin 2
Hicran and Adnan are happily married with their 1 year old child. On the first birthday, Birol was squashed under a huge cupboard while Hicran was in the kitchen. After the three months later, in the cemetery, Hicran was alone crying over his child tomb. Then she spotted that two women in black are watching her.At home, Adnan accused her for being unresponsible mother and he will not be able to forgive her. Everyday Hicran washed the dead child clothes and dried it as she thinks he is alive. A friend of Hicran has pity on her and tell her to meet Abdullah Hodjah but she refuses. Hicran is troubled by the women who seemed to be evils and she decided to go to Hodjah once. Hodjah said that her son is in Heaven with the angels and she has been trap in a bad spell which has a link with her aunts. Hicran goes to her mother's house to enquire about her aunt. Hicran's mother narrates her that she had a sister whose husband was a gambler and he had killed his daughters brutally. There, Hicran stays and told her grandmother that she missed Birol so much. The next day, Hicran goes to the aunt's village to know more. Adnan killed himself in the loss of Birol at his tomb. Inside the aunt's house, she found an old doll which she kept it. Hicran went to her mother again and asked the aunt's photographs. Hicran returned at home and searched for Adnan but didn't find him. Worried, she goes to Adnan's workplace to meet him but his colleague say that he had not come to work for a while. 
Hicran give Hodjah the old doll then he finds that a chit inside in it wrote an evil spell. Hodjah said that there's someone who had summoned a demon to destroy her family. To know the truth, Hicran went to her mother and found her grandmother sit on sofa. She revealed that Necmiye is jealous of her sister zehra. Zehra is happy with her loving husband Ramazan and her two beautiful daughters - aged nine and four. Ramazan wants a son who can protect his daughters. When Necmiye found out, she told her sister that her mother in law can help them. The mother in law take a chit, put in the doll and stitches it 41 times. She said them rest assured. They were eager for it. After some days, Ramazan murdered her daughters with an axe by blindfold them. Then he tried to kill Zehra while she was praying, but he cannot. He put disel and burn himself in front of his wife. Zehra gave birth seven months later to Hicran which Necmiye and her mother in law help her. Necmiye stole Hicran from her because she was sterile. Soon after delivering, Necmiye killed Zehra by suffocation. Hicran found Necmiye died in her room by being possessed.
Hicran returned home, saw her husband, child and her aunt's family. And the movie ends up saying that Hicran stayed with her deceased husband and child for two months. Fifteen months later, Hodja broke the spell, Hicran remarried.

Awards 
The third installment of the franchise, Sijjin 3: Crime of Love, was nominated for SIYAD Award by Turkish Film Critics Association in 2016. Director Alper Mestçi received nomination for the Giovanni Scognamillo Award in Best Fantastic Film category, same year, for the entry.

References 

Turkish horror films